The 2020–21 NBL season was the 43rd season for the Illawarra Hawks in the NBL, and their first under the leadership of their new head coach Brian Goorjian.

Roster

Signings

 The Illawarra Hawks retained five players due to them signing multiple season contracts, who were Angus Glover, Sam Froling, Todd Blanchfield, Emmett Naar and Sunday Dech.
 Following the rebranding of the club to The Hawks by the new owners, on 23 June Brian Goorjian was signed as the new head coach. Due to the club being liquidated, all remaining contracts were voided.
 On 15 July, Emmett Naar re-signed with The Hawks for a fourth season.
 On 16 July, Deng Deng returned to Australia on a one-year deal with The Hawks.
 On 21 July, Daniel Grida also re-signed with The Hawks.
 On 22 July, Sam Froling returned to The Hawks on a two-season deal.
 On 23 July, Deng Adel signed with The Hawks.
 On 24 July, Stanford University college guard Isaac White signed with the club.
 On 28 July, Tyler Harvey signed with The Hawks on a one-year deal.
 On 4 August, Cameron Bairstow returned from his short stint in Europe to sign with The Hawks.
 On 5 August, New Zealand teenager Max Darling signed with The Hawks.
 On 14 August, former NBA G League player Justin Simon signed with the club on a one-year deal.
 On 28 August, The Hawks signed Justinian Jessup to their Next Stars roster position. Jessup, who played college basketball for the Boise State Broncos, was signing his first professional contract.
 On 8 September, Andrew Ogilvy re-signed with The Hawks as an injury replacement for Grida.
 On 12 October, The Hawks announced that Akoldah Gak had signed a three-year contract with the club, with the first season as a development player.
 On 12 January, Lachlan Dent was signed as a development player.
 On 3 May, Adel and the Hawks mutually agreed to part ways due to ongoing injuries.
 On 11 May, Tim Coenraad came out of retirement to join the Hawks as an injury replacement for Cameron Bairstow.

Squad

Pre-season

Ladder

Game log 

|-style="background:#fcc;"
| 1
| 15 December
| @ Perth
| L 91–83
| Justinian Jessup (24)
| Deng Deng (7)
| Adel, Harvey, Jessup, Naar (2)  
| RAC Arenanot announced
| 0–1
|-style="background:#cfc;"
| 2
| 17 December
| @ Perth
| W 74–82
| Tyler Harvey (18)
| Andrew Ogilvy (7)
| Emmett Naar (5) 
| Bendat Basketball Centrenot announced
| 1–1
|-style="background:#fcc;"
| 3
| 20 December
| @ Sydney
| L 98–89
| Justinian Jessup (21)
| Deng Deng (9)
| Tyler Harvey (4)
| Qudos Bank Arenaclosed event
| 1–2

Regular season

Ladder

Game log 

|-style="background:#cfc;"
| 1
| 16 January
| @ Brisbane
| W 84–90
| Sam Froling (19)
| Cameron Bairstow (9)
| Justin Simon (5)
| Nissan Arena1,746
| 1–0
|-style="background:#cfc;"
| 2
| 18 January
| @ Cairns
| W 76–92
| Tyler Harvey (25)
| Justin Simon (12)
| Tyler Harvey (7)
| Cairns Pop-Up Arena1,808
| 2–0
|-style="background:#cfc;"
| 3
| 21 January
| @ Brisbane
| W 82–90
| Tyler Harvey (31)
| Ogilvy, Simon (9)
| Justinian Jessup (6)
| Nissan Arena1,591
| 3–0
|-style="background:#cfc;"
| 4
| 28 January
| @ Cairns
| W 70–90
| Tyler Harvey (21)
| Froling, Ogilvy (8)
| Justin Simon (4)
| Cairns Pop-Up Arena1,849
| 4–0

|-style="background:#fcc;"
| 5
| 7 February
| @ South East Melbourne
| L 98–82
| Deng Adel (17)
| Sam Froling (11)
| Adel, Naar, Simon (3)
| State Basketball Centre2,175
| 4–1
|-style="background:#fcc;"
| 6
| 10 February
| Melbourne
| L 88–91
| Justinian Jessup (24)
| Sam Froling (11)
| Tyler Harvey (4)
| WIN Entertainment Centre3,459
| 4–2
|-style="background:#cfc;"
| 7
| 14 February
| @ Sydney
| W 82–85
| Tyler Harvey (25)
| Cameron Bairstow (10)
| Justinian Jessup (3)
| Qudos Bank Arena6,534
| 5–2

|-style="background:#fcc;"
| 8
| 20 February
| @ Cairns
| L 101–95
| Tyler Harvey (24)
| Sam Froling (12)
| Tyler Harvey (6)
| John Cain Arena3,711
| 5–3
|-style="background:#cfc;"
| 9
| 22 February
| New Zealand
| W 102–88
| Tyler Harvey (22)
| Froling, Simon (6)
| Tyler Harvey (4)
| John Cain Arena2,313
| 6–3
|-style="background:#fcc;"
| 10
| 26 February
| @ Brisbane
| L 97–91
| Justinian Jessup (26)
| Cameron Bairstow (8)
| Justin Simon (4)
| John Cain Arena809
| 6–4
|-style="background:#fcc;"
| 11
| 28 February
| @ South East Melbourne
| L 93–76
| Tyler Harvey (14)
| Deng Adel (7)
| Justinian Jessup (4)
| John Cain Arena3,195
| 6–5
|-style="background:#cfc;"
| 12
| 4 March
| Adelaide
| W 98–89
| Tyler Harvey (24)
| Justin Simon (9)
| Tyler Harvey (6)
| State Basketball Centre1,355
| 7–5
|-style="background:#fcc;"
| 13
| 7 March
| Perth
| L 70–87
| Tyler Harvey (17)
| Justin Simon (7)
| Justin Simon (3)
| John Cain Arena3,696
| 7–6
|-style="background:#cfc;"
| 14
| 11 March
| @ Sydney
| W 69–89
| Sam Froling (20)
| Bairstow, Froling (6)
| Tyler Harvey (4)
| John Cain Arena997
| 8–6
|-style="background:#cfc;"
| 15
| 13 March
| Melbourne
| W 77–69
| Tyler Harvey (23)
| Adel, Harvey, Jessup (6)
| Tyler Harvey (4)
| John Cain Arena4,183
| 9–6

|-style="background:#fcc;"
| 16
| 21 March
| @ Melbourne
| L 75–65
| Justinian Jessup (13)
| Sam Froling (11)
| Adel, Harvey, Naar (2)
| John Cain Arena2,552
| 9–7
|-style="background:#fcc;"
| 17
| 26 March
| @ Perth
| L 81–70
| Justinian Jessup (15)
| Tyler Harvey (8)
| Adel, Naar, Ogilvy (2)
| RAC Arena10,216
| 9–8
|-style="background:#cfc;"
| 18
| 29 March
| Brisbane
| W 96–72
| Tyler Harvey (28)
| Deng Adel (11)
| Deng Adel (6)
| WIN Entertainment Centre2,521
| 10–8

|-style="background:#fcc;"
| 19
| 1 April
| South East Melbourne
| L 63–95
| Justinian Jessup (21)
| Sam Froling (11)
| Harvey, Naar, Ogilvy, Simon 2
| WIN Entertainment Centre2,602
| 10–9
|-style="background:#fcc;"
| 20
| 3 April
| @ Adelaide
| L 84–72
| Justinian Jessup (17)
| Sam Froling (12)
| Froling, Naar, Simon (3)
| Adelaide Entertainment Centre5,686
| 10–10
|-style="background:#fcc;"
| 21
| 7 April
| Brisbane
| L 82–88
| Justinian Jessup (19)
| Deng Deng (8)
| Froling, Harvey 4
| WIN Entertainment Centre2,426
| 10–11
|-style="background:#cfc;"
| 22
| 9 April
| South East Melbourne
| W 82–80
| Justinian Jessup (26)
| Deng Deng (7)
| Tyler Harvey (4)
| WIN Entertainment Centre2,533
| 11–11
|-style="background:#cfc;"
| 23
| 11 April
| Cairns
| W 82–80
| Tyler Harvey (35)
| Andrew Ogilvy (9)
| Andrew Ogilvy (5)
| WIN Entertainment Centre3,064
| 12–11
|-style="background:#fcc;"
| 24
| 16 April
| @ Perth
| L 83–69
| Sam Froling (15)
| Sam Froling (8)
| Emmett Naar (4)
| RAC Arena11,485
| 12–12
|-style="background:#fcc;"
| 25
| 18 April
| @ Melbourne
| L 87–76
| Justinian Jessup (19)
| Sam Froling (7)
| Emmett Naar (4)
| John Cain Arena3,794
| 12–13
|-style="background:#fcc;"
| 26
| 24 April
| Sydney
| L 75–79 (OT)
| Sam Froling (22)
| Sam Froling (12)
| Emmett Naar (12)
| WIN Entertainment Centre3,724
| 12–14

|-style="background:#cfc;"
| 27
| 3 May
| @ New Zealand
| W 67–75
| Tyler Harvey (29)
| Justin Simon (6)
| Sam Froling (4)
| Silverdome1,097
| 13–14
|-style="background:#cfc;"
| 28
| 11 May
| Adelaide
| W 71–66
| Tyler Harvey (23)
| Deng Deng (9)
| Tyler Harvey (7)
| WIN Entertainment Centre2,036
| 14–14
|-style="background:#cfc;"
| 29
| 15 May
| New Zealand
| W 73–71
| Tyler Harvey (24)
| Sam Froling (12)
| Coenraad, Grida, Harvey, Jessup, Simon (1)
| WIN Entertainment Centre2,456
| 15–14
|-style="background:#fcc;"
| 30
| 18 May
| Melbourne
| L 87–102
| Deng Deng (15)
| Deng Deng (8)
| Harvey, Naar (4)
| WIN Entertainment Centre1,794
| 15–15
|-style="background:#cfc;"
| 31
| 21 May
| @ Adelaide
| W 73–81
| Sam Froling (19)
| Deng, Froling (7)
| Emmett Naar (7)
| Adelaide Entertainment Centre6,090
| 16–15
|-style="background:#cfc;"
| 32
| 23 May
| Cairns
| W 93–81
| Justinian Jessup (24)
| Andrew Ogilvy (11)
| Tyler Harvey (9)
| WIN Entertainment Centre2,258
| 17–15
|-style="background:#cfc;"
| 33
| 28 May
| @ New Zealand
| W 73–84
| Tyler Harvey (30)
| Froling, Harvey, Simon (8)
| Tyler Harvey (4)
| Franklin Pool and Leisure Centre1,100
| 18–15
|-style="background:#cfc;"
| 34
| 30 May
| Adelaide
| W 97–83
| Tyler Harvey (23)
| Harvey, Ogilvy (6)
| Harvey, Naar (5)
| WIN Entertainment Centre3,004
| 19–15

|-style="background:#cfc;"
| 35
| 1 June
| Perth
| W 81–79
| Tyler Harvey (27)
| Andrew Ogilvy (7)
| Harvey, Ogilvy (3)
| WIN Entertainment Centre2,038
| 20–15
|-style="background:#fcc;"
| 36
| 3 June
| Sydney
| L 73–79
| Froling, Naar, White (12)
| Sam Froling (7)
| Emmett Naar (6)
| WIN Entertainment Centre3,217
| 20–16

Postseason

|-style="background:#cfc;"
| 1
| 10 June
| @ Perth
| W 72–74
| Justinian Jessup (17)
| Justin Simon (9)
| Emmett Naar (5)
| RAC Arena7,662
| 1–0
|-style="background:#fcc;"
| 2
| 12 June
| Perth
| L 71–79
| Tyler Harvey (24)
| Coenraad, Froling (5)
| Justin Simon (5)
| WIN Entertainment Centre5,217
| 1–1
|-style="background:#fcc;"
| 3
| 14 June
| @ Perth
| L 79–71
| Sam Froling (14)
| Justin Simon (11)
| Justin Simon (4)
| RAC Arena8,986
| 1–2

Awards

Player of the Week 
Round 1, Justin Simon

Round 5, Tyler Harvey

Round 13, Tyler Harvey

Round 20, Tyler Harvey

See also 
 2020–21 NBL season
 Illawarra Hawks

References

External links 
 Official Website

Illawarra Hawks
Illawarra Hawks seasons
Illawarra Hawks season